Gamze Bezan (born 31 August 1994) is a Turkish women's football midfielder, who last played in the First League for İlkadım Belediyesi Yabancılar Pazarı Spor with jersey number 22. In 2010, she played for the Turkish girls' national U-17 team.

She is studying physical education and sports in Gümüşhane University.

Career

Club

Gamze Bezan received her license on 10 April 2008 for her hometown club Trabzonspor, where she played until the end of the 2010–11 season capping 25 times and scoring 3 goals. After dissolution of the women's football branch of the club, she transferred to Trabzon İdmanocağı, another local women's club.

Following the 2010–11 season, she was honored with the title "Best Women's Footballer of Trabzonspor" bestowed by the fans of the club.

After playing five seasons for her hometown club, she transferred to İlkadım Belediyesi Yabancılar Pazarı Spor of Samsun in the 2016–17 season.

International
Bezan was admitted to the Turkey girls' U-17 team, and debuted in the 2011 UEFA Women's Under-17 Championship – Group 6 match against England on 3 October 2010. She cappen twice for the Turkey U-17 nationals.

She was called up to the Turkey women's U-19 team for the first time in 2011. Bezan was elected again in 2012 to play at the 2013 UEFA Women's U-19 Championship First qualifying round matches. However, she did not find a place in the squad later on.

Career statistics
.

Honours
 Turkish Women's First League
 Trabzon İdmanocağı
 Third places (3): 2011–12, 2014–15, 2015–16

References

External links

 

Living people
1994 births
Sportspeople from Trabzon
Turkish women's footballers
Trabzonspor women's players
Trabzon İdmanocağı women's players
Women's association football midfielders
İlkadım Belediyespor players